Amphibolips is an American genus of gall wasps in the family Cynipidae. There are about 57 described species in the genus Amphibolips with several others still undescribed.

Species
The following species belong to the genus Amphibolips:

 Amphibolips acuminata Ashmead, 1896
 Amphibolips aliciae Medianero & Nieves-Aldrey, 2010
 Amphibolips arbensis Mehes, 1953
 Amphibolips bassae Cuesta-Porta et al, 2020
 Amphibolips bromus Cuesta-Porta et al, 2020
 Amphibolips castroviejoi Medianero & Nieves-Aldrey, 2010
 Amphibolips cibriani Pujade-Villar, 2018
 Amphibolips comini Cuesta-Porta et al, 2020
 Amphibolips confluenta (Harris, 1841) - Spongy oak apple gall wasp
 Amphibolips cookii Gillette, 1888
 Amphibolips dampfi Kinsey, 1937
 Amphibolips durangensis Nieves-Aldrey et al, 2012
 Amphibolips elatus Kinsey, 1937
 Amphibolips ellipsoidalis Weld, 1926
 Amphibolips femoratus (Ashmead, 1887)
 Amphibolips fusus Kinsey, 1937
 Amphibolips gainesi Bassett, 1900
 Amphibolips globulus Beutenmüller
 Amphibolips globus Weld
 Amphibolips gumia Kinsey, 1937
 Amphibolips hidalgoensis Pujade-Villar & Melika, 2011
 Amphibolips ilicifoliae Basset, 1864
 Amphibolips jaliscensis Nieves-Aldrey et al, 2012
 Amphibolips jubatus Kinsey, 1937
 Amphibolips kinseyi Castillejos-Lemus, Oyama, & Nieves-Aldrey, 2020
 Amphibolips magnigalla Castillejos-Lemus, Oyama, & Nieves-Aldrey, 2020
 Amphibolips maturus Kinsey, 1937
 Amphibolips melanocera Ashmead, 1885
 Amphibolips michoacaensis  Nieves-Aldrey et al, 2012
 Amphibolips montana Beutenmüller
 Amphibolips murata Weld, 1957
 Amphibolips nassa Kinsey, 1937
 Amphibolips nebris Kinsey, 1937
 Amphibolips nevadensis Nieves-Aldrey et al, 2012
 Amphibolips niger Beutenmüller, 1911
 Amphibolips nigrialatus Castillejos-Lemus, Oyama, & Nieves-Aldrey, 2020
 Amphibolips nubilipennis Beutenmüller, 1909 - Translucent oak gall wasp
 Amphibolips oaxacae Nieves-Aldrey et al, 2012
 Amphibolips quercuscinerea Ashmead, 1881
 Amphibolips quercuscitriformis Ashmead, 1881
 Amphibolips quercuscoelebs Osten Sacken, 1861
 Amphibolips quercusfuliginosa Ashmead, 1885
 Amphibolips quercusinanis Osten Sacken, 1861 - Larger empty oak apple wasp
 Amphibolips quercusjuglans (Osten Sacken, 1862) - Acorn plum gall wasp
 Amphibolips quercusostensackenii Felt, 1917
 Amphibolips quercuspomiformis Kinsey, 1922 - Apple gall wasp
 Amphibolips quercusracemaria Ashmead, 1881
 Amphibolips quercusrugosa Ashmead, 1881
 Amphibolips quercusspongifica Osten Sacken, 1861
 Amphibolips rulli Cuesta-Porta et al, 2020
 Amphibolips salicifoliae Cuesta-Porta et al, 2020
 Amphibolips spinosa Ashmead, 1887
 Amphibolips tarasco Nieves-Aldrey et al, 2012
 Amphibolips tinctoriae Ashmead, 1896
 Amphibolips trizonata Ashmead, 1896
 Amphibolips turulli Cuesta-Porta et al, 2020
 Amphibolips zacatecaensis Melika & Pujade-Villar, 2011

References

Further reading

 
 
 

Cynipidae
Hymenoptera genera
Gall-inducing insects
Oak galls